Steven Emil Johnson (born June 22, 1965) is an American former professional football player who was a tight end for the New England Patriots of the National Football League (NFL). He played college football for the Virginia Tech Hokies. He was selected in the sixth round of the 1988 NFL Draft by the Patriots.

Johnson later became president and owner of Johnson Commercial Development. Based in Bristol, Virginia, it is one of the largest commercial developers in the Southeast. One of its projects, The Pinnacle in Bristol, Tennessee, was among the largest commercial projects in the country.

In 2013, Johnson gifted $1 million toward the construction of the Virginia Tech Indoor Practice Facility, and the university named the adjacent Steve Johnson Practice Fields in his honor.

References

External links

1965 births
Living people
American football tight ends
New England Patriots players
Players of American football from Alabama
Sportspeople from Huntsville, Alabama
Virginia Tech Hokies football players